Mendo Mill & Lumber is a chain of 5 hardware stores in the Lake and Mendocino counties.

History
In 1944, original owners and World War II veterans Ross and John Mayfield moved to California where they opened a lumber mill on Orr Springs road in Ukiah, California. It remained in operation there until the 1950s, when the Mayfields opened a hardware store on North State Street after their children started high school. In the 1960s the company was purchased by Joe, a son of one of the Mayfield families who expanded the original Ukiah location to its current size including an area to purchase items to help build a house which current owner Mike Mayfield claimed was "Pioneering" in that it was the first to do so before the "big box" stores. A third location was established on East Commercial Street in Willits sometime in the 1970s while a fourth was opened in Clearlake, California later that same decade. A Fort Bragg, California location was established in the mid-80s. In 2000 Mike Mayfield was appointed CEO in 2000 after Joe retired. On July 28, 2010, it was reported that Mendo Mill purchased Piedmont Lumber in Lakeport for an undisclosed amount.

References

1944 establishments in California
American companies established in 1944
Hardware stores of the United States
Companies based in Mendocino County, California